SP-225  is a state highway in the state of São Paulo in Brazil. Part of it consists of the Rodovia Nilo Paulo Romano and Rodovia Dep. Rogê Ferreira.

References

Highways in São Paulo (state)